Michael Stewart Pease OBE (2 October 1890 – 27 July 1966) was a British classical geneticist at Cambridge University.

Michael Pease was the son of Edward Reynolds Pease, writer and a founding member of the Fabian Society, of the Pease family of Quakers. He was educated at Bedales School and Trinity College, Cambridge, where he was elected chairman of the Cambridge University Fabian Society. On 24 February 1920 he married Helen Bowen Wedgwood, daughter of the Labour politician Josiah Wedgwood IV (later 1st Baron Wedgwood), of the Wedgwood pottery family at Chelsea Register Office. Their children include the physicist Bas Pease and Jocelyn Richenda Gammell Pease (1925–2003), who married the Nobel Prize–winning biologist Andrew Huxley.

He worked at the Genetical Institute of Cambridge as assistant to Reginald Crundall Punnett, who created the first auto-sexing chicken breeds, the Cambar and Legbar, in which the sex of day-old chicks was clearly distinguishable from the plumage. When, in 1930, a separate poultry research facility was established, Pease headed it. He also served as a Labour councillor on the Cambridge County Council for Girton.  He was appointed to be an Ordinary Officers of the Civil Division of the Order of the British Empire in 1966 for political and public services in Cambridgeshire.

He was held in the civilian internment camp at Ruhleben, near Berlin, during the First World War. His father, a Major at the time, asked whether he could be exchanged for a German prisoner wishing to return to Berlin, but without success. While interned Pease tried to get gardens put into the camp and on 27 April 1916 gave a lecture on dancing in Elizabethan times.

References

External links

 Fisher-Pease correspondence
 The Peerage

1890 births
1966 deaths
Alumni of Trinity College, Cambridge
British geneticists
Officers of the Order of the British Empire
World War I civilian detainees held by Germany
British World War I prisoners of war
Michael
People from Girton, Cambridgeshire
People educated at Bedales School